In mathematics, a Carleman matrix is a matrix  used to convert function composition into matrix multiplication. It is often used in iteration theory to find the continuous iteration of functions which cannot be iterated by pattern recognition alone. Other uses of Carleman matrices occur in the theory of probability generating functions, and Markov chains.

Definition
The Carleman matrix of an infinitely differentiable function  is defined as:

Generalization
A generalization of the Carleman matrix of a function can be defined around any point, such as:
 
or  where . This allows the matrix power to be related as:

General Series 
Another way to generalize it even further is think about a general series in the following way:
Let  be such that  where .
Now 

Examples 
If we set  we have the Carleman matrix

If  is an orthonormal basis for a Hilbert Space with a defined inner product , we can set  and  will be . If  we have the analogous for Fourier Series, namely

Properties
Carleman matrices satisfy the fundamental relationship

Here the term  denotes the composition of functions .

Other properties include:
, where  is an iterated function and 
, where  is the inverse function (if the Carleman matrix is invertible).

Examples
The Carleman matrix of a constant is:

The Carleman matrix of the identity function is:

The Carleman matrix of a constant addition is:

The Carleman matrix of the successor function is equivalent to the Binomial coefficient:

The Carleman matrix of the logarithm is related to the (signed) Stirling numbers of the first kind scaled by factorials:

The Carleman matrix of the logarithm is related to the (unsigned) Stirling numbers of the first kind scaled by factorials:

The Carleman matrix of the exponential function is related to the Stirling numbers of the second kind scaled by factorials:

The Carleman matrix of exponential functions is:

The Carleman matrix of a constant multiple is:

The Carleman matrix of a linear function is:

The Carleman matrix of a function  is:

The Carleman matrix of a function  is:

Related matrices
The Bell matrix or the Jabotinsky matrix of a function  is defined as

so as to satisfy the equation

These matrices were developed in 1947 by Eri Jabotinsky to represent convolutions of polynomials. It is the transpose of the Carleman matrix and satisfy

See also
 Carlemann linearization
 Composition operator
 Function composition
 Schröder's equation
 Bell polynomials

Notes

References 
 R Aldrovandi, Special Matrices of Mathematical Physics: Stochastic, Circulant and Bell Matrices, World Scientific, 2001. (preview)
 R. Aldrovandi, L. P. Freitas, Continuous Iteration of Dynamical Maps, online preprint, 1997.
 P. Gralewicz, K. Kowalski, Continuous time evolution from iterated maps and Carleman linearization, online preprint, 2000.
 K Kowalski and W-H Steeb, Nonlinear Dynamical Systems and Carleman Linearization, World Scientific, 1991. (preview)

Functions and mappings
Matrix theory